Sarabande and Danse is a ballet made by Jacques d'Amboise to Debussy's Sarabande (1901) and Danse (1890). The premiere took place May 29, 1975, as part of New York City Ballet's Ravel Festival at the Lincoln Center.

Original cast  

   
Colleen Neary
Bart Cook
 
Kyra Nichols
Francis Sackett 

Ballets by Jacques d'Amboise
New York City Ballet repertory
New York City Ballet Ravel Festival
1975 ballet premieres
Ballets to the music of Claude Debussy